Marija Vuković (born 21 January 1992) is a Montenegrin athlete specializing in the high jump. She won Montenegro’s first ever European Athletics Championship medal with silver in the high jump at Munich 2022.

As a 17-year-old Vuković was the 2009 European Junior Championship silver medallist. By winning the 2010 World Junior Championships, she became her country's first ever medallist in a global athletics competition.

Biography
Marija Vuković was born in Knin, Croatia. She emigrated to Cetinje in 1995. 

She won the silver medal in high jump competition at the 2009 European Junior Championships in Novi Sad, Serbia, and gold at the 2010 World Junior Championships held in Moncton, Canada, which was the first medal won by a Montenegrin athlete in global competition.

Vuković competed at the 2020 Tokyo Olympics and finished ninth.

Competition record

Notes

References

External links

1992 births
Living people
Montenegrin female high jumpers
Athletes (track and field) at the 2020 Summer Olympics
Olympic athletes of Montenegro
World Athletics Championships athletes for Montenegro
Athletes (track and field) at the 2015 European Games
European Games competitors for Montenegro
Athletes (track and field) at the 2009 Mediterranean Games
Mediterranean Games competitors for Montenegro
Competitors at the 2015 Summer Universiade
Competitors at the 2017 Summer Universiade
Sportspeople from Knin
People from the Republic of Serbian Krajina
Yugoslav Wars refugees
20th-century Montenegrin women
21st-century Montenegrin women
Athletes (track and field) at the 2022 Mediterranean Games
Mediterranean Games gold medalists for Montenegro
Mediterranean Games gold medalists in athletics
European Athletics Championships medalists